The Canada Games Centre was built for the 2011 Canada Winter Games in Clayton Park, a suburb of Halifax, Nova Scotia. It was the venue for the artistic gymnastics, badminton, and synchronized swimming competitions.  It is now used as a fitness, swimming, track, basketball, and yoga recreation facility.

History
The Canada Games Centre replaced the nearby Northcliffe swimming pool and community centre, which was aging and offered fewer facilities, but garnered criticism that the higher membership fees priced some community members out, many seniors in particular.

The complex cost about C$45 million and was designed by DSRA Architecture of Halifax. It opened in January 2011.

Design and facilities
It contains a field house, running track, 25-metre pool, leisure pool, a fitness centre, multi-purpose rooms, cafes, and social spaces.

The building is LEED Silver certified for its sustainable and resource-efficient features. The Canada Games Centre is located next to the newly built Lacewood Bus Terminal (08/2017), which provides transit service throughout the Halifax Regional Municipality.

References

2011 Canada Winter Games
Buildings and structures completed in 2011
Sports venues in Halifax, Nova Scotia
Canada Games venues
Swimming venues in Canada